Dave Kleis (born January 21, 1964) is a Minnesota small business owner and politician serving as the mayor of St. Cloud, Minnesota, United States since 2005.

Kleis served in the Minnesota State Senate from 1995 to 2005 as a Republican. In the 2005 mayoral election he defeated incumbent John Ellenbecker.

References

Living people
1964 births
Mayors of St. Cloud, Minnesota
Republican Party Minnesota state senators
People from Stearns County, Minnesota
21st-century American politicians